The following Confederate Army units and commanders fought in the Second Battle of Corinth of the American Civil War on October 3 and 4, 1862, in Corinth, Mississippi. Order of battle compiled from the army organization during the battle and reports.   The Union order of battle is listed separately.

Abbreviations used

Military rank
 MG = Major General
 BG = Brigadier General
 Col = Colonel
 Ltc = Lieutenant Colonel
 Maj = Major
 Cpt = Captain
 Lt = Lieutenant

Other
 w = wounded
 mw = mortally wounded
 k = killed
 c = captured

Army of West Tennessee

MG Earl Van Dorn

Price's Corps (Army of the West)
MG Sterling Price

District of the Mississippi
BG Daniel Ruggles (not present)

Notes

References
 U.S. War Department, The War of the Rebellion: a Compilation of the Official Records of the Union and Confederate Armies, U.S. Government Printing Office, 1880–1901.
 Cozzens, Peter, The Darkest Days of the War: The Battles of Iuka and Corinth, Chapel Hill, University of North Carolina Press, 1997, .
 

American Civil War orders of battle